Kineta is a genus of skippers in the family Hesperiidae of butterflies.

References

Natural History Museum Lepidoptera genus database

Hesperiidae genera
Hesperiidae